The 2010–11 Nemzeti Bajnokság II was Hungary's the 60th season of the Nemzeti Bajnokság II, the second tier of the Hungarian football league system.

League table

Eastern group

Western group

See also
 2010–11 Magyar Kupa
 2010–11 Nemzeti Bajnokság I
 2010–11 Nemzeti Bajnokság III

References

External links
  
  

Nemzeti Bajnokság II seasons
2010–11 in Hungarian football
Hun